Scaleform GFx is a discontinued game development middleware package, a vector graphics rendering engine used to display Adobe Flash-based user interfaces and HUDs for video games. In March 2011, Autodesk acquired Scaleform Corporation and Scaleform GFx became part of the Autodesk Gameware line of middleware. On July 12, 2018, Autodesk discontinued Scaleform GFx, and it is no longer available for purchase.

Authors created user interfaces using Adobe Flash authoring tools, such as Adobe Animate (formerly Adobe Flash Professional); the resulting SWF files were used directly by the GFx libraries, providing similar functionality to the Adobe Flash Player but optimized for use within game engines.

Scaleform GFx supported all major platforms, including game consoles, mobile and PC operating systems. Scaleform provides APIs for direct communication between Flash content and the game engine, and pre-built integrations for popular engines such as Unity, Unreal Engine, and CryENGINE. Scaleform GFx could also be licensed for use as a standalone Flash runtime system on mobile platforms, competing with Adobe AIR.

Features
Scaleform GFx contains several core systems, including:
a GPU-accelerated rendering engine for display objects, featuring a vector-to-triangle tessellation engine with an edge anti-aliasing algorithm that uses subpixel triangles to smooth the edges
mesh rendering backends for DirectX and OpenGL APIs
a mesh cache to manage tessellated triangle data
a vector-graphic based font system that uses a single texture to dynamically cache glyphs on demand
support for all major Flash display classes including Sprite, MovieClip, TextField and Filters (Glow, Bevel, DropShadow, etc.)
optimized ActionScript 3 and ActionScript 2 virtual machines with garbage collector, as well as GFx-specific ActionScript extensions
audio support via a licensee-implementable C++ interface, with a default implementation supporting FMOD

Additional components
In addition to the engine, documentation, and samples, the Scaleform GFx SDK includes several additional components:

Separately-licensed add-ons
Scaleform also provided two optional add-ons for GFx:

Technology partners

Game engines
Source Engine (Scaleform was used as the former UI backend for Counter-Strike: Global Offensive, prior to the game switching to Valve's in-house Panorama UI.)
Unreal Engine 3 and UDK
Crytek CryEngine 2 and CryEngine 3
Emergent Gamebryo and LightSpeed
Sony PhyreEngine
Infernal Engine
BigWorld
HeroEngine
Trinigy Vision Engine
Instinct Technology
LithTech
RAGE (used in the game Grand Theft Auto V for almost everything, including the map)
RedEngine

Other middleware
CRI Movie
FMOD
GameSpy
Raknet

See also
 Autodesk Gameware
 gameswf

References

External links
 Scaleform's official website
 Scaleform GFx on MobyGames
 Scaleform on MobyGames
 Scaleform on LinkedIn
 Flash in Games SIG on IGDA
 ScaleForm GFx on UDK

Autodesk discontinued products
3D graphics software
C++ software
Middleware for video games
Video game development software